Alexandra Palace is a Grade II listed entertainment and sports venue in London, situated between Wood Green and Muswell Hill in the London Borough of Haringey. It is built on the site of Tottenham Wood and the later Tottenham Wood Farm. Originally built by John Johnson and Alfred Meeson, it opened in 1873 but following a fire two weeks after its opening, was rebuilt by Johnson. Intended as "The People's Palace" and often referred to as "Ally Pally", its purpose was to serve as a public centre of recreation, education and entertainment; North London's counterpart to the Crystal Palace in South London.

At first a private venture, in 1900, the owners planned to sell it and Alexandra Park for development. A group of neighbouring local authorities managed to acquire it. An Act of Parliament created the Alexandra Palace and Park Trust. The Act required the trustees to maintain the building and park and make them available for the free use and recreation of the public forever. The present trustee is the London Borough of Haringey, whose coat of arms shows lightning bolts depicting Alexandra Palace's pioneering role in the development of television.

In 1935, the trustees leased part of the palace to the BBC for use as the production and transmission centre for their new television service. In 1936, it became the home of the BBC's first regular public television service. The broadcasting system was the 405-line monochrome analogue televisionthe first fully electronic television system to be used in regular broadcasting. Although other facilities soon superseded it after the war, Alexandra Palace continued to be used by the BBC for many years and its radio and television mast is still in use.

The original studios 'A' and 'B' still survive in the southeast wing with their producers' galleries and are used for exhibiting original historical television equipment. The original Victorian theatre with its stage machinery also survives and as of 2019, is back in use. The theatre and stage structure is on English Heritage's Buildings at Risk register. Alexandra Palace became a listed building in 1996, at the instigation of the Hornsey Historical Society.

A planned commercial development of the building into a mixed leisure complex including a hotel, replacement ice-skating rink, cinema, ten-pin bowling alley and exhibition centre, encountered opposition from public groups and was blocked by the High Court in 2007.

The Great Hall and West Hall are typically used for exhibitions, music concerts, and conferences, operated by the trading arm of the charitable trust that owns the building and park on behalf of the public. There is also a pub, ice rink, palm court, and a panoramic view of central London.

In 2013, Alexandra Park was declared a local nature reserve and is also a Site of Borough Importance for Nature Conservation, Grade 1.

The nearest railway stations are the Alexandra Palace with Great Northern services from Moorgate and London Underground station Wood Green on the Piccadilly line. Alexandra Palace is also served by London Buses route W3.

History

19th century

The "Palace of the People" was conceived by Owen Jones in 1859. The Great Northern Palace Company had been established by 1860, but was initially unable to raise financing for the construction of the Palace. Construction materials were acquired and recycled from the large 1862 International Exhibition building in South Kensington after it was demolished: the Government had declined to take it over. Alexandra Park was opened to the public on 23 July 1863.

The planned building was originally named "The Palace of the People"; it and its park were renamed to commemorate the popular new Princess of Wales, Alexandra of Denmark, who had married Prince Albert Edward on 10 March 1863. The Palace of the People, or the People's Palace, remained as alternative names. In September 1865, construction commenced but to a design by John Johnson and Alfred Meeson rather than the glass structure initially proposed by Jones.

In 1871, work started on the Edgware, Highgate and London Railway to connect the site to Highgate station. Work on both the railway and the palace was completed in 1873 and, on 24 May of that year, Alexandra Palace and Park was opened. The palace was built by Kelk and Lucas, who also built the Royal Albert Hall in South Kensington at around the same time. Sims Reeves sang on the opening day before an audience of 102,000. Only 16 days later, Alexandra Palace was destroyed by a fire which also killed three members of staff. Only the outer walls survived; a loan exhibition of a collection of English pottery and porcelain, comprising some 4,700 items of historic and intrinsic value, was also destroyed.

The palace was quickly rebuilt and reopened on 1 May 1875. The new Alexandra Palace contained a concert hall, art galleries, a museum, lecture hall, library, banqueting room and large theatre. The stage of the theatre incorporated machinery which enabled special effects for the pantomimes and melodramas then popular – artists could disappear, reappear and be propelled into the air. The theatre was also used for political meetings. An open-air swimming pool was constructed at the base of the hill in the surrounding park; it is long since closed and little trace remains except some reeds.

The grounds included a horse racing course with grandstand (named Alexandra Park Racecourse and nicknamed the "Frying Pan" and the "Pan Handle" because of its layout), which was London's only racecourse from 1868 until its closure in 1970, a Japanese village, a switchback ride, a boating lake and a 9-hole pitch-and-putt golf course. Alexandra Park cricket and football clubs have also played within the grounds (in the middle of the old racecourse) since 1888. A Henry Willis organ installed in 1875, vandalised in 1918 and restored and reopened in 1929, survives. In its 1929 restored form, Willis's masterpiece was declared by Marcel Dupré to be the finest concert organ in Europe.

20th century

In 1900, the owners of Alexandra Palace and Park were threatening to sell them for redevelopment, but a consortium of public-spirited men in the district, headed by Mr. Henry Burt JP, a member of the Middlesex County Council and of Hornsey District Council, at once embraced the opportunity of securing the palace and the beautiful grounds for the people of London. A committee was formed by Burt and the consortium managed to raise enough money to purchase them just in time. By the Alexandra Park and Palace (Public Purposes) Act 1900, a charitable trust was created; representatives of the purchasing local authorities became the trustees with the duty to keep both building and park "available for the free use and recreation of the public forever".

In 1921 a plaque was erected at the entrance of the south terrace in honour of Burt. The palace passed into the hands of the Greater London Council in 1967, with the proviso that it should be used entirely for charitable purposes, and their trusteeship was transferred to Haringey council in 1980.

During the First World War the park was closed and the palace and grounds were first used as refugee camp for displaced Belgians, and then later from 1915 to 1919 as an internment camp for German and Austrian civilians. The camp commandant was Lt. Col. R. S. F. Walker until his death in May 1917.

The theatre was greatly altered in the early 1920s, with the general manager, W. J. MacQueen-Pope, spending the war reparation money on refurbishing the auditorium. He abandoned the understage machinery that produced the effects necessary in Victorian melodrama; some of the machinery is preserved, and there is a project to restore some of it to working order. After these changes, the theatre was leased by Archie Pitt, then husband of Gracie Fields, who appeared in the theatre. Fields also drew an audience of 5,000 people to the hall for a charity event.

In 1935, the trustees leased part of the palace to the BBC for use as the production and transmission centre for their new BBC Television service. The antenna was designed by Charles Samuel Franklin of the Marconi Company. The world's first public broadcasts of (then) "high-definition" television were made from Alexandra Palace in November 1936, an event which is alluded to by the rays in the modern coat of arms of the London Borough of Haringey. Two competing systems, Marconi-EMI's 405-line system and John Logie Baird's 240-line system, were installed, each with its own broadcast studio and were transmitted on alternate weeks until the 405-line system was chosen in 1937. After the BBC leased the eastern part of the palace the theatre was only used for props storage space.

The palace continued as the BBC's main transmitting centre for London until 1956, interrupted only by the Second World War when the transmitter found an alternative use jamming German bombers' navigation systems. In 1944, a German doodlebug exploded just outside the organ end of the Great Hall and the Rose Window was blown in, leaving the organ exposed to the elements. In 1947 some of the pieces of the shattered rose window were incorporated in a new design by architect E.T. Spashett during renovation of bomb-damaged public buildings by the Ministry of Works. During the 1940s and 1950s the palace also housed a public roller-skating rink and the Alexandra Palace Roller Skating Club.

In the early 1960s, an outside broadcast was made from the top of the tower, in which the first passage of a satellite across the London sky was watched and described. It continued to be used for BBC News broadcasts until 1969, and for the Open University until 1981. The antenna mast still stands and is used for local terrestrial television transmission, local commercial radio and DAB broadcasts. The main London television transmitter is now at Crystal Palace in south London.

Early in 1980, Haringey council took over the trusteeship of Alexandra Palace from the GLC, intending to refurbish the building but just six months later, during Capital Radio's Jazz Festival, a fire started under the organ and quickly spread. It destroyed half the building. Again the outer walls survived and the eastern parts, including the theatre and the BBC Television studios and aerial mast, were saved. Parts of the famous organ were destroyed, though it had been dismantled for repairs so some parts (including nearly all the pipework) were away from the building in store. Some of the damage to the palace was repaired immediately but Haringey council overspent on the restoration, creating a £30 million deficit. It was then reopened to the public in 1988 under a new management team headed by Louis Bizat. Later the council was heavily criticised for the overspend in a report by Project Management International.

In 1991, the attorney-general stated that the overspending by the council as trustee was unlawful and so could not be charged to the charity. The council for some years did not accept this politically embarrassing finding and instead maintained that the charity "owed" the council £30 million, charged compound interest on what it termed a "debt" (which eventually rose to a claim of some £60 million), and to recoup it tried to offer the whole palace for sale.

An ice rink was installed at Alexandra Palace in 1990. Primarily intended for public skating, it has also housed ice hockey teams including the Haringey Racers, the Haringey Greyhounds, the London Racers and now the Haringey Huskies, as well as a figure skating club, the Alexandra Palace Amateur Ice Skating Club.

21st century

In June 2004, the first performances for about 70 years took place in the theatre, first in its foyer then in July in the theatre itself. Although conditions were far from ideal, the audience was able to see the potential of this very large space – originally seating 3,000, it could not be licensed for more than a couple of hundred. It was intended that the theatre would reopen, but much costly restoration would be required first. It will never again reach a seating capacity of 3,000 (not least because one balcony was removed in the early part of the 20th century as a fire precaution, when films started to be shown there). A major season of the theatre company Complicite was planned for 2005 but the project, which would have included some repair and access work, was cancelled due to higher-than-anticipated costs.

Plans by the current trustees, Haringey Council, to replace all the charitable uses by commercial ones by a commercial lease of the entire building, including a casino, encountered considerable public and legal opposition, and on 5 October 2007, in the High Court, Mr. Justice Sullivan granted an application by Jacob O'Callaghan, a London resident, to quash the Charity Commission's order authorising a 125-year lease of the entire building to Firoka Ltd.

A masterplan for the future of the site was drawn up in 2012, comprising six 'big ideas' to restore and redevelop the palace. The first of these to be implemented aims to transform the derelict eastern end of the palace, making accessible the Victorian theatre and historic BBC Studios. In 2013 the Heritage Lottery Fund awarded a Round 1 pass to develop the proposals, creating a new entrance in the restored East Court, re-establishing the theatre as a flexible performance space and re-opening the BBC Studios as a visitor attraction. There was controversy regarding plans to demolish the brick infills in the colonnade on the south-east face of the building, which the BBC constructed after 1936 to form their television studios within. Following a public consultation and advice from English Heritage, Planning and Listed Building Consent was given for the proposals and in March 2015 HLF awarded Round 2 major grant funding securing a positive future for the historic areas.

In 2018 it was announced that the Theatre would open for a BBC Proms performance on 1 September before officially reopening to the public on 1 December 2018 following the completion of the East Wing Restoration Project by the contractor Willmott Dixon. The opening programme included performances from Dylan Moran, Horrible Histories, Gilbert & George, Gareth Malone and an evening of jazz presented by Ronnie Scott's.

Notable events

Alexandra Palace has hosted a number of significant events over the course of its history. Recurring events held there include the Great British Beer Festival (1977–1980), the Brit Awards (1993–1995), the PDC World Darts Championship (2008–present) and the Masters snooker tournament (2012–2020 and 2022).

In November every year, a large fireworks display is scheduled there as part of London's Bonfire Night celebrations.

1960s
The Observer'''s Wildlife Exhibition held here in 1963 was an important early event in highlighting awareness of worldwide endangered species, and it gained a large attendance (46,000).

In April 1967, a benefit event took place there. The 14 Hour Technicolor Dream, organised by the International Times, demonstrated the importance of the quickly developing Underground scene. Although venues such as the UFO Club were hosting counter-cultural bands, this was certainly the largest indoor event at the time. Performers included headlining act Pink Floyd as well as the Pretty Things, Savoy Brown, the Crazy World of Arthur Brown, Soft Machine, The Purple Gang, The Move and Sam Gopal's Dream (featuring Sam Gopal, Mick Hutchinson and Pete Sears). John Lennon attended, and Yoko Ono (who was soon to become Lennon's new romantic partner) presented her performance work "Cut Piece".

1970s

In 1970, Italian director Lucio Fulci filmed an important segment of his giallo film A Lizard in a Woman's Skin here. Alexandra Palace posed as a disused church. The rock band Led Zeppelin played at Alexandra Palace's Grand Hall in two sell out performances on the evenings of the 22/23 December 1972. Their concert tickets were priced at £1 each for the two hour long gig and were uniquely made available from specific Harlequin Record Shops within Central London.

In 1973, the Divine Light Mission held a "Festival of Love" there. Also in 1973, British rock band Wishbone Ash played a Christmas concert at the palace, billed as "Christmas at the Palace".

The American band Grateful Dead played a series of three shows there between 9 and 11 September 1974 and a recording of portions of all three shows was released as part of the Dick's Picks series in March 1997.

The Campaign for Real Ale held the Great British Beer Festival there from 1977 to 1980 (the 1980 edition taking place in tents outside the fire-damaged Alexandra Palace). On the afternoon of 10 July 1980 (an accidental) fire destroyed the Great Hall, Banqueting Suite, Dressing Rooms and Ice Rink during contractors routine repairs and maintenance.

From July 27 to August 5 The London Music Festival '73 was held here. It claimed to be the biggest indoor rock festival ever staged.

1980s
After the fire, the burnt-out shell of the great hall of Alexandra Palace was used as Victory Square in Michael Radford's 1984 film adaptation of George Orwell's novel Nineteen Eighty-Four.

The Sinclair C5 battery electric vehicle was launched at the palace in January 1985, one week after the closure of the 405-line television system that was inaugurated there 49 years earlier.

In November 1989 the Stone Roses played their first major gig in the South of England at Alexandra Palace, notable particularly as the band sold the venue out before being featured significantly in the music press or making any national television appearances.

1990s
Hugh Cornwell played his last gig with the Stranglers at Alexandra Palace in August 1990. This would be documented with the Saturday Night, Sunday Morning album and video.

Blur performed a major concert at the venue in October 1994 to promote their album Parklife. The recording of the concert was released on video in February 1995 with the title Showtime and used as the basis for the video for the band's song "End of a Century".

From 1993 to 1995, the Brit Awards were hosted at Alexandra Palace. In November 1996 it was the venue for the annual MTV Europe Music Awards.

In 1996, the Palace hosted the inaugural London Model Engineering Exhibition which continued each year until 2021 when it was cancelled due to the COVID-19 pandemic.

2000s
In April 2000, the funeral service of the Labour MP Bernie Grant took place at the Palace. An estimated 3,000 people attended. 

The fourth Mind Sports Olympiad was held at Alexandra Palace in August 2000, with more than 4,000 competitors from around the world taking part in mind sports.

In December 2002, The Miss World 2002 pageant was staged in the venue at short notice, having originally been scheduled for Abuja, Nigeria.

In June 2007, a Hackday event was hosted at Alexandra Palace by the BBC and Yahoo! During the event, the building was struck by lightning, causing the fire vents to open (and then get stuck open), and it rained inside the building.

Since December 2007, Alexandra Palace has hosted the PDC World Darts Championship, following 14 years from December 1993 to January 2007 of the tournament being held at the Circus Tavern in Purfleet, Essex. The palace was previously home to the News of the World Darts Championship between 1963 and 1977.

April 2008 saw the relaunch of the regular antiques fairs, now held four times a year, organised by International Antiques & Collectors Fairs (IACF).

2010s

The band Portishead hosted one of two All Tomorrow's Parties festivals titled I'll Be Your Mirror in July 2011 at Alexandra Palace. The 50th anniversary programme of Songs of Praise was recorded there in September 2011 and broadcast the following month.

Since 2012, it is the venue for the Masters snooker tournament, held every January. The only year it was not held at the venue was 2021 as a result of the COVID-19 pandemic.

During the 2012 Summer Olympics it served as the official hospitality venue for the Dutch Olympic team.

In November 2012, it was the venue for the annual Warped Tour, a music and extreme sports festival.

Alexandra Palace continues to be a prolific and high-profile music venue attracting internationally renowned artists. Suede appeared in March 2013, playing one of the first dates in support of Bloodsports, their first new album in more than a decade. In September 2013, Björk performed one of the final concerts of her Biophilia Tour. The show was the last concert to be held "in the round", a format which characterised the tour, and the first to be performed in this way at Alexandra Palace. The eclectic programming has included in 2015, Florence and the Machine playing 4 dates of their How Big, How Blue, How Beautiful Tour in the palace as well as in 2016 alone, heavy metal band Slipknot, Drum & Bass DJ Andy C and the Last Shadow Puppets; with sell out shows by Twenty One Pilots and Panic at the Disco.

The bootcamp stage for series 13 of The X Factor was filmed at the Alexandra Palace from 6 to 8 July 2016.

2020s
In June 2020, Nick Cave recorded the live album and concert film Idiot Prayer in the West Hall. On the record, he performs songs from throughout his career solo on the piano. 

On 18 April 2021, London Grammar performed their third album, Californian Soil'', live at Alexandra Palace.

The Duke and Duchess of Cambridge presented the Earthshot Prizes, with many celebrity guests, at Alexandra Palace on 17 October 2021.

Fontaines DC performed the last show of their 2021 UK tour at Alexandra Palace on 27 October 2021.

On 19 May 2022 Charli XCX took to the stage for her largest show to date, mid way through her Europe and North American tour: Crash the Live Tour.

On 5 March 2023 Pendulum performed a stand alone sold out show after a last minute venue change from the o2 Academy in Brixton following a crush at a previous gig.

Notes and references

External links

Alexandra Palace (Victorian London)
Save Ally Pally: campaign to maintain the charitable status of the palace and preserve its TV studios, organ and Victorian theatre for the public

Detailed history of early BBC TV broadcasts, with archive photos – 9 July 2003
Alexandra Palace Television Society
Unofficial History of BBC Television at Alexandra Palace
Pictures and Information About Alexandra Palace History 
Hornsey Historical Society
Friends of Alexandra Park – website promoting and protecting Alexandra Park in North London
Friends of Alexandra Palace Theatre
Restoration – Alexandra Palace – The East Wing Keith Armstrong 2018 The author’s personal photographic record documenting the 2 year project.
History of the Peoples Palace – West Corridor Murals designed and painted by Haringey Mural Workshop artists: Gary Drostle, Ruth Priestly, Hilary Leobner, Joann White, John Beaumont

 
Structures on the Heritage at Risk register in London
History of the London Borough of Haringey
History of Middlesex
Middlesex
Former buildings and structures in the London Borough of Haringey
Music venues in London
Television studios in London
Media and communications in the London Borough of Haringey
Exhibition and conference centres in London
History of television in the United Kingdom
History of broadcasting
BBC Television
BBC offices, studios and buildings
Indoor ice hockey venues in England
Grade II listed buildings in the London Borough of Haringey
Darts venues
Snooker venues
Palaces in London
Grade II listed palaces
Tourist attractions in the London Borough of Haringey
Badminton venues
Rebuilt buildings and structures in the United Kingdom
John Johnson buildings